The 2018–19 ACB season, also known as Liga Endesa for sponsorship reasons, was the 36th season of the Spanish basketball league. It started on 29 September 2018 with the first round of the regular season and ended on 21 June 2019 with the finals.

Real Madrid defended successfully the title and conquered its second consecutive league, 35th overall.

Teams

Promotion and relegation (pre-season)
A total of 18 teams contested the league, including 16 sides from the 2017–18 season and two promoted from the 2017–18 LEB Oro. This include the top team from the LEB Oro, and the winners of the LEB Oro playoffs.

Teams promoted from LEB Oro
Cafés Candelas Breogán
Baxi Manresa

Venues and locations

Personnel and sponsorship

Notes
1. Cultura del Esfuerzo is the motto of the club.

Managerial changes

Season summary
On 30 September 2018, just in the first round and coming back Cafés Candelas Breogán 12 years later to the Liga ACB, their inaugural match against Divina Seguros Joventut was postponed due to problems with the main clock and the shot clocks.

Regular season

League table

Positions by round
The table lists the positions of teams after completion of each round. In order to preserve chronological evolvements, any postponed matches are not included in the round at which they were originally scheduled, but added to the full round they were played immediately afterwards. For example, if a match is scheduled for round 13, but then postponed and played between rounds 16 and 17, it will be added to the standings for round 16.

Results

Playoffs

Final standings

Attendances
Attendances include playoff games:

Awards
All official awards of the 2018–19 ACB season.

MVP

Source:

Finals MVP

Source:

All-ACB Teams

Source:

Best Young Player Award

Source:

Best All-Young Team

Source:

Best Coach

Source:

Player of the round

Source:

Player of the month

Source:

ACB clubs in European competitions

References and notes

External links
 Official website  
 2018–19 ACB Statutes and Regulations 

 
ACB

Spanish
Liga ACB seasons